Eschelberg is a town in Upper Austria, Austria. It is part of the municipality of Sankt Gotthard im Mühlkreis. The town was first fortified in 1206 and the castle there was built around 1598.

Cities and towns in Urfahr-Umgebung District